Lieutenant-Colonel Donald Dickson Farmer VC MSM (28 May 1877 – 23 December 1956) was a Scottish recipient of the Victoria Cross, the highest and most prestigious award for gallantry in the face of the enemy that can be awarded to British and Commonwealth forces.

Early military service
Farmer joined the Queen's Own Cameron Highlanders on 29 March 1892, and served with the 1st Battalion in the Sudan Campaign, 1898, and was present at the battles of Atbara and Khartoum.

Details on Victoria Cross
Farmer was 23 years old, and a sergeant in the 1st Battalion, the Cameron Highlanders, during the Second Boer War when he won the VC on 13 December 1900 at Nooitgedacht, South Africa. His citation reads:

Later military career
He served in South Africa throughout the war, and returned home with other officers and men of the 1st Battalion Cameron Highlanders on the SS Dunera, which arrived at Southampton in October 1902.

During World War I he served with the King's Regiment (Liverpool).

The medal
His Victoria Cross is displayed at the Regimental Museum of Queens Own Highlanders, Fort George, Inverness-shire, Scotland.

References

Monuments to Courage (David Harvey, 1999)
The Register of the Victoria Cross (This England, 1997)
Scotland's Forgotten Valour (Graham Ross, 1995)
Victoria Crosses of the Anglo-Boer War (Ian Uys, 2000)
Liverpool VCs (James Murphy, Pen and Sword Books, 2008)

External links

Location of grave and VC medal (Liverpool)
 

1877 births
1956 deaths
19th-century Scottish people
20th-century Scottish people
Second Boer War recipients of the Victoria Cross
British recipients of the Victoria Cross
Queen's Own Cameron Highlanders soldiers
Queen's Own Cameron Highlanders officers
British Army personnel of the Mahdist War
British Army personnel of the Second Boer War
People from Kelso, Scottish Borders
British Army personnel of World War I
King's Regiment (Liverpool) officers
British prisoners of war of the Second Boer War
British Army recipients of the Victoria Cross
Recipients of the Meritorious Service Medal (United Kingdom)
Burials at Anfield Cemetery
Scottish military personnel